Ken Dickson ( – ) was a Scottish and British wheelchair curler.

Ken was one of the stalwarts of wheelchair curling in Scotland and also played a pivotal role in the development of the Borders and Kinross Wheelchair Curling Clubs. Ken was a successful international curler representing both Scotland and Great Britain. He was a two time World Champion in 2004 and 2005 and a 2006 Paralympic silver medalist in Torino.

During the  he played second for team England, finishing in sixth place.

Dickson died on 15 February 2013 at the Victoria Hospital, Kirkcaldy.

Teams

References

External links 

1946 births
2013 deaths
People from Stranraer
Sportspeople from Dumfries and Galloway
Scottish male curlers
Scottish wheelchair curlers
Scottish Paralympic competitors
Paralympic silver medalists for Great Britain
Paralympic wheelchair curlers of Great Britain
Wheelchair curlers at the 2006 Winter Paralympics
Medalists at the 2006 Winter Paralympics
World wheelchair curling champions
Scottish wheelchair curling champions
English male curlers
English wheelchair curlers
Place of birth missing
Paralympic medalists in wheelchair curling